Oleo is a term for oils. It is commonly used to refer to a variety of things:

 Colloquial term for margarine, a.k.a. oleomargarine
 Oleic acid
 Oleo strut, a type of shock absorbers on aircraft landing gear
 "Oleo" (composition), a musical composition by Sonny Rollins
 Oleo (Grant Green album), a 1962 album featuring the above composition
 Oleo (Lee Konitz album), a 1975 album featuring the above composition
 Oleo (Joe McPhee album), a 1983 album featuring the above composition
 Oleo (New York Unit album), a 1989 album featuring the above composition
 Óleo, a city in the São Paulo state in Brazil
 GNU Oleo, a (defunct) spreadsheet program
 Oleo drop, a kind of theater curtain

See also 
 Olio (disambiguation)